Feeling Good Is Good Enough is the third studio album by American stoner metal band ASG. It was their third studio album released by Volcom Entertainment. Singles from the album include "John Wayne", "Horse Whipper", and the title track.  The quote "Feeling good is good enough" is a direct homage to the feature film Platoon when the words were said by Willem Dafoe to Charlie Sheen after they smoked marijuana out of a shotgun.

Track listing

Personnel
Credits adapted from AllMusic:
ASG
 Jason Shi – lead vocals, guitar
 Jonah Citty – guitar
 Andy Ellis – bass, backing vocals
 Scott Key – drums

Additional
Matt Hyde – audio production, engineer, mixing, producer
Philip Caivano – audio production, producer
Richard Woolcott – executive producer
Mike Masters – audio engineer
Edmond Monsef – mixing assistant
Ryan Immegart – A&R, artwork, concept, layout design, photography
Todd Messick – photography

References

2005 albums
ASG (band) albums
Volcom Entertainment albums
Albums recorded at Sound City Studios